73rd NYFCC Awards
January 6, 2008

Best Picture: 
 No Country for Old Men 

The 73rd New York Film Critics Circle Awards, honoring the best in film for 2007, were voted on 11 December 2007 and given out 6 January 2008.

Winners

Best Actor:
Daniel Day-Lewis – There Will Be Blood
Runner-up: Viggo Mortensen – Eastern Promises
Best Actress:
Julie Christie – Away from Her
Runner-up: Elliot Page – Juno
Best Animated Feature:
Persepolis
Best Cinematography:
Robert Elswit – There Will Be Blood
Best Director:
Joel Coen and Ethan Coen – No Country for Old Men
Runners-up: Paul Thomas Anderson – There Will Be Blood and Todd Haynes – I'm Not There
Best Film:
No Country for Old Men
Runners-up: There Will Be Blood and I'm Not There
Best First Film:
Sarah Polley – Away from Her
Best Foreign Language Film:
Das Leben der Anderen (The Lives of Others) • Germany
Best Non-Fiction Film:
No End in Sight
Best Screenplay:
Joel Coen and Ethan Coen – No Country for Old Men
Runners-up: Diablo Cody – Juno, Tamara Jenkins – The Savages, and James Vanderbilt – Zodiac
Best Supporting Actor:
Javier Bardem – No Country for Old Men
Best Supporting Actress:
Amy Ryan – Gone Baby Gone
Runner-up: Cate Blanchett – I'm Not There
Lifetime Achievement:
Sidney Lumet
Special Critics' Award:
Charles Burnett – Killer of Sheep

Notes

References

External links
 2007 Awards

2007
New York Film Critics Circle Awards
2007 in American cinema
New
New